Joseph Lawson (13 November 1893 - ), was an English cricketer who played for Gloucestershire. He was born in Stroud, Gloucestershire and died in Wellington, New Zealand.

Lawson made a single first-class appearance for the team, during the 1914 season, against Northamptonshire. From the lower-middle order, he scored three runs in the first innings in which he batted, and a single run in the second, as Gloucestershire lost the match by an innings margin.

External links
Joseph Lawson at Cricket Archive

1893 births
1969 deaths
Cricketers from Stroud
English cricketers
Gloucestershire cricketers